Harbison State Forest is a State Forest in Richland County, South Carolina.  It is named for Samuel P. Harbison of Pittsburgh, Pennsylvania, who provided the majority of funds for the land purchase.

The forest is found in the Midlands region of central South Carolina and comprises  of woodland, meadowland, and bottomland located alongside the Broad River in Richland County, South Carolina.  Located approximately 8 miles from the downtown area Columbia, South Carolina, Harbison State Forest is one of the largest urban green spaces inside city limits in the eastern United States.

References

 

Protected areas of Richland County, South Carolina
South Carolina state forests
Nature centers in South Carolina